Charles Robert Ayre (December 22, 1819 – April 12, 1889) was an English-born merchant and political figure in Newfoundland. He represented Burin in the Newfoundland House of Assembly from 1873 to 1878 as a Conservative.

He was born in Exeter and came to Newfoundland in 1842 as a clerk. By 1856, he had established his own business, Ayre and Sons, in St. John's with John Steer. Ayre served in the Legislative Council of Newfoundland from 1879 to 1889 and was a minister without portfolio in the Executive Council in 1885. He died in St. John's at the age of 69.

His son John also served in the Newfoundland assembly.

References 
 

Members of the Newfoundland and Labrador House of Assembly
Newfoundland Colony people
1819 births
1889 deaths
Canadian company founders
Retail company founders
English emigrants to pre-Confederation Newfoundland